Albin Rogelj (20 February 1929 – 3 February 2023) was a Slovene ski jumper who represented Yugoslavia at the 1956 Winter Olympics, placing 23rd in the normal hill event. Later, he worked as a caricaturist for the Pavliha satirical weekly, becoming one of the most recognized Slovene caricaturists.

References

External links

 Lambiek Comiclopedia biography.

1929 births
2023 deaths
Skiers from Ljubljana
Slovenian male ski jumpers
Olympic ski jumpers of Slovenia
Ski jumpers at the 1956 Winter Olympics
Slovenian cartoonists
Slovenian caricaturists
Slovenian comics artists